Jungdong High School is a high school for boys located in Daegu, South Korea.

History
School building(west building)was built in 30 November 1980 and establishment of the school was approved on 15 January 1981 by founder 김정수(Kim Jungsoo), and the opening ceremony was held on 5 March 1981. On 25 January 1983 East building was built and next year's Feburary, the first graudation ceremony was held with 412 students.  On 21 January 1998 the multimedia classroom was completed, and on 21 August 2009 the  English classroom was completed.

Symbols
The tree that symbolizes the school is the juniper. The tree is intended to symbolize the hope that the students will become persons who make a clean and green society and contribute to social development. The school flower is the magnolia, which symbolizes the desire to become a person who is always able to love others.

School Lesson 
꿈을 가진 사람(理想), 공부하는 사람(努力), 행하는 사람(實踐)[Person who has dream, Person who study, Person who act]

References

External links
 Official website

Educational institutions established in 1981
High schools in Daegu
Boys' schools in South Korea
1981 establishments in South Korea